Special Delivery is the second studio album by southern rock band 38 Special, released in 1978. Neon Park was responsible for the album's artwork.

Track listing

Side One
"I'm a Fool for You" (John Cascella) – 3:12
"Turnin' to You" (Don Barnes, Jeff Carlisi) – 3:57
"Travelin' Man" (Barnes, Carlisi, Donnie Van Zant) – 4:14
"I Been a Mover" (Carlisi, Van Zant) – 4:17

Side Two
"What Can I Do?" (Barnes, Van Zant) – 4:26
"Who's Been Messin'" (Barnes, Carlisi, Van Zant, Dan Hartman) – 4:11
"Can't Keep a Good Man Down" (Barnes, Van Zant, Larry Junstrom) – 3:16
"Take Me Back" (Barnes, Van Zant) – 5:12

Personnel
Donnie Van Zant – lead vocals
Don Barnes – acoustic guitar, electric guitar, background vocals, twelve-string guitar
Jeff Carlisi – acoustic guitar, electric guitar, steel guitar, slide guitar
Larry Junstrom – bass guitar
Steve Brookins – drums
Jack Grondin – drums

Additional personnel
Terry Emery – percussion, piano
Billy Powell - piano (tracks 1 & 8)

Production
Producer: Dan Hartman

References

38 Special (band) albums
1978 albums
A&M Records albums
Albums produced by Dan Hartman
Albums with cover art by Neon Park